Why We Love Dogs, Eat Pigs, and Wear Cows: An Introduction to Carnism is a 2009 book by American social psychologist Melanie Joy about the belief system and psychology of meat eating, or "carnism". Joy coined the term carnism in 2001 and developed it in her doctoral dissertation in 2003. Carnism is a subset of speciesism, and contrasts with ethical veganism, the moral commitment to abstain from consuming or using meat and other animal products. In 2020, an anniversary edition of the book was published by publisher Red Wheel.

Background
Joy, a social psychologist and author, was concerned about linguistic bias inherent in terms like carnivore, which were inaccurate and failed to account for the "beliefs beneath the behavior".  Carnivores require meat in their diet for survival, but carnists choose to eat meat based on their beliefs. There was no  label, Joy discovered, for the beliefs of people who produce, consume, and promote meat eating.  She created the term carnism (Latin carn, flesh or body) to name and describe this dominant cultural belief system.  "We assume that it is not necessary to assign a term to ourselves when we adhere to the mainstream way of thinking, as though its prevalence makes it an intrinsic part of life rather than a widely held opinion. Meat eating, though culturally dominant, reflects a choice that is not espoused by everybody", Joy writes.

Synopsis
Carnism, according to Joy, is the dominant, yet invisible paradigm in modern culture supporting the choice to consume meat. Carnism is an invisible system of beliefs in both the social, psychological, and physical sense.  For example, in the physical sense, an estimated 10 billion land animals are slaughtered for their meat every year in the United States, yet most of the animals are never seen—they are kept in confined animal feeding operations, invisible to the public and off limits to the media.  Joy maintains that the choice to eat meat is not natural or a given as proponents of meat claim, but influenced by social conditioning.  The majority of people, Joy claims, care deeply about animals and do not want them to suffer.

Joy argues there is a neurological basis for empathy; most people care about nonhuman animals and want to prevent their suffering.  Further, humans value compassion, reciprocity, and justice. However, human behavior does not match these values. To continue to eat animals, Joy argues, people engage in psychic numbing, which alters the perception of our behavior towards animals and uses defense mechanisms to block empathy.

First, carnism denies there is a problem with eating animals; second, it justifies eating meat as normal, natural, and necessary; third, to prevent cognitive dissonance, carnism alters the perception of the animals as living individuals into food objects, abstractions, and categories.  People who hold to these beliefs may also be called carnists.

Through this denial, justification, and perceptual distortion, Joy argues, carnism influences people to violate their core values. Animal advocates and cultural studies scholars have implicated both the government and the media as the two primary channels responsible for legitimizing carnist discourse in the United States.

Critical reception
Writer Megan Kearns agrees with Joy's argument that the system of carnism is at odds with democracy, but takes issue with Joy blaming the system rather than the people who make carnist choices: "[The] way we as a society envision eating and animals is contradictory and insidious.  Yet it seems incongruous to blame the system and simultaneously hold people accountable to awaken their consciences and exercise their free will."  Kearns also notes that not only are there many empathic people who choose to eat meat, but many vegetarians who base their diet on health, not moral reasons.

Helena Pedersen of Malmö University questions whether it is accurate for Joy to treat meat eaters as a homogenous group as there may be many different types of meat eaters all of whom have different reasons for eating meat. Proponents of the abolitionist theory of animal rights, such as Gary L. Francione, do not accept the concept of carnism as they believe it indirectly supports the animal welfare position by neglecting to call for the immediate rejection of all animal use and for not explicitly promoting veganism.

Influence 
Journalist Avery Yale Kamila reviewed Joy's book in 2020 and said it has "played a pivotal role" in changing "how humans think about animals." Kamila wrote:In December, Vox put Why We Love Dogs at the top of its list of "19 books from the 2010s we can't stop thinking about." In January, Joy talked with The Washington Post about "Why that vegan meal at the Golden Globes set off so many critics." And this summer one of three winning essays (out of 1,242 submissions) in The New York Times' annual Student Editorial Contest was headlined "Bringing Ethics to Your Plate" and cited the book in its second paragraph.

Editions 
The book has also been translated into several languages, including Hebrew, Hungarian, Italian, Korean, French, Traditional Chinese, Swedish, Danish, Croatian, Spanish, German, Portuguese and Dutch.

A 10th anniversary edition was released in 2020, with a new foreword by Yuval Noah Harari.

See also
 Ethics of eating meat
 List of vegan media

References

Further reading
Fox, Katrina (June 18, 2010). Eating meat isn't natural: it's carnism. ABC News (Australia).
Horse meat not scandalous to Toronto deli owner. The Canadian Press. March 10, 2013.
Knight, Alison (November 29, 2012).  Carnism founder finds Joy in her work . UWO Gazette. p. 4. (print version)
Kranjec, Mankica (April 17, 2012). Zlati prinašalec za kosilo?. Jana
Moller, Valdemar (December 4, 2012). Varje dag ställs vi inför valet om vad vi ska äta. Fria Tidningen.
Samson, Claudette (November 22, 2012). Le véganisme, un refus de l'exploitation des animaux . Le Soleil'.
Schott, Ben (January 11, 2010). Carnism. The New York Times.
Socha, Kim; Sarahjane Blum (2013). Confronting Animal Exploitation: Grassroots Essays on Liberation and Veganism. McFarland. .
Spencer, Stephan (September 13, 2012). Friend or Food? The Ideology of How We Decide. Huffington Post.
Vereecken, Kathleen (December 15, 2012). Dierenliefde gaat niet door de maag. De Standaard.

Bibliography
Pilisuk, Marc, Joy, M. (2001). Humanistic Psychology and Ecology. In Kirk J. Schneider, James F. T. Bugental and J. Fraser Pierson (Ed.), The Handbook of Humanistic Psychology: Leading Edges in Theory, Research, and Practice (pp. 101–114). Sage Publications. .
Joy, M. (March 2003). Toward a Non-Speciesist Psychoethic. Society & Animals 11(1), 103-104. 
Joy, M. (Winter 2005). Humanistic Psychology and Animal Rights: Reconsidering the Boundaries of the Humanistic Ethic. Journal of Humanistic Psychology 45(1), 106-130. 
Joy, M. (January 21, 2013). Speaking Truth to Power: Understanding the Dominant, Animal-Eating Narrative for Vegan Empowerment and Social Transformation. One Green Planet.
Joy, M. (February 26, 2013). Why Horsemeat Is Delicious and Disgusting. Huffington Post''.

Author interviews

2010 non-fiction books
Books about animal rights
Books about veganism
Vegetarian-related mass media
Vegetarianism in the United States